World Laughter Day was established in 1998 and the first celebration was on 10 May 1998, in Mumbai, India, arranged by Dr. Madan Kataria, founder of the worldwide Laughter Yoga movement. 

The day is now celebrated on first Sunday of May worldwide.

History

World Laughter Day was created in 1998 by Dr. Madan Kataria, founder of the
worldwide Laughter Yoga movement. Dr. Kataria, a family doctor in India, was inspired to start the Laughter Yoga movement in part by the facial feedback hypothesis, which postulates that a person's facial expressions can have an effect on their emotions. The celebration of World Laughter Day is a positive manifestation for world peace and is intended to build up a global consciousness of brotherhood and friendship through laughter.
It is most often celebrated by gatherings of people in public places with the sole purpose of laughing. Its popularity has grown exponentially  with that of the Laughter Yoga movement now counting thousands of Laughter Clubs in more than 115 countries. And now it is celebrated worldwide.

References

External links
Official World Laughter Day Website
LaughterYoga.org page

May observances
Unofficial observances
1998 establishments in Maharashtra
Recurring events established in 1998
Laughter